Chernoochene Municipality is a municipality in Kardzhali Province, Bulgaria. The administrative centre is the village of Chernoochene.

Demographics
According to the 2011 census, the municipality of Chernoochene has the highest relative share of ethnic Bulgarian Turks (97.1%), as well as Muslims (96.6%) of the total country. Chernoochene is a rural municipality, with all of its inhabitants living in one of the fifty villages. As of December 2018, the municipality of Chernoochene has 8,791 inhabitants.

Religion
According to the latest Bulgarian census of 2011, the religious composition, among those who answered the optional question on religious identification, was the following: 

Most ethnic Turks are Muslim. Most ethnic Bulgarians are Orthodox Christians, living in the village of Pchelarovo. All other villages have a Turkish and Islamic majority.

References 

Municipalities in Kardzhali Province